Nett Lake is an unincorporated community and census-designated place (CDP) in Nett Lake Territory, Saint Louis County, Minnesota, United States; located on the shore of Nett Lake. As of the 2010 census, its population was 284.

The community of Nett Lake is located 18 miles west of Orr, and 31 miles northwest of Cook.

Saint Louis County Road 23 (CR 23) (Nett Lake Road) serves as a main route in the community.

The unincorporated community of Nett Lake is located within the Nett Lake Indian Reservation (Bois Forte Indian Reservation).

Demographics

References

 Rand McNally Road Atlas – 2007 edition – Minnesota entry
 Official State of Minnesota Highway Map – 2011/2012 edition

Unincorporated communities in Minnesota
Census-designated places in Minnesota
Census-designated places in St. Louis County, Minnesota
Unincorporated communities in St. Louis County, Minnesota